Udaipur Lok Sabha constituency one of the 25 Lok Sabha (parliamentary) constituencies in Rajasthan state in India.

Assembly segments
Presently, Udaipur Lok Sabha constituency comprises eight Vidhan Sabha (legislative assembly) segments. These are:

Members of Parliament

Election results

General election 2019

General election 2014

General election 2009

See also
 Udaipur district
 List of Constituencies of the Lok Sabha

Notes

Lok Sabha constituencies in Rajasthan
Udaipur district